Taeniotes  is a genus of flat-faced longhorns beetles in the subfamily Lamiinae of the family Cerambycidae.

Species
Species within this genus include:
 Taeniotes affinis Breuning, 1935
 Taeniotes amazonum Thomson, 1857
 Taeniotes batesi (Thomson, 1879)
 Taeniotes boliviensis Dillon & Dillon, 1941
 Taeniotes buckleyi Bates, 1872
 Taeniotes cayennensis Thomson, 1859
 Taeniotes chapini Dillon & Dillon, 1941
 Taeniotes dentatus Dillon & Dillon, 1941
 Taeniotes farinosus (Linnaeus, 1758)
 Taeniotes inquinatus Thomson, 1857
 Taeniotes insularis Thomson, 1857
 Taeniotes iridescens Dillon & Dillon, 1941
 Taeniotes leucogrammus Thomson, 1865
 Taeniotes luciani  Thomson, 1859
 Taeniotes marmoratus Thomson, 1865
 Taeniotes naevius Bates, 1872
 Taeniotes orbignyi Guérin-Méneville, 1844
 Taeniotes parafarinosus Breuning, 1971
 Taeniotes peruanus Breuning, 1971
 Taeniotes praeclarus Bates, 1872
 Taeniotes scalatus (Gmelin, 1790)
 Taeniotes similis Dillon & Dillon, 1941
 Taeniotes simplex Gahan, 1888
 Taeniotes subocellatus (Olivier, 1792)
 Taeniotes xanthostictus Bates, 1880

References

 
Lamiini